Chiloglanis polyodon is a species of upside-down catfish endemic to Sierra Leone where it is only known from the headwaters of the Bagbwe River.  This species grows to a length of  TL.

References

External links 

polyodon
Freshwater fish of West Africa
Endemic fauna of Sierra Leone
Fish described in 1932